Volkovo is a rural locality (a village) in Domshinskoye Rural Settlement, Sheksninsky District, Vologda Oblast, Russia. The population was 33 as of 2002.

Geography 
Volkovo is located 42 km southeast of Sheksna (the district's administrative centre) by road. Gubino is the nearest rural locality.

References 

Rural localities in Sheksninsky District